Armando Romero (born 1964 in Mexico City, Mexico) is a Mexican painter.

Biography 

Romero studied at the Escuela Nacional de Pintura, Escultura y Grabado "La Esmeralda", in Mexico City. From 1991 to 1997, Romero taught sculpture, painting and art history at La Esmeralda. Additionally, from 1991 to 1993, Romero taught art history, design, and drawing at the College Center for Studies in Science and Communications in Mexico City, and also in 2002 taught painting at the School for Visual Arts in Michoacán, Mexico.

In 1998, Romero represented Mexico in the Emerging Artists of Latin America exhibition at the Passage de Retz gallery in Paris, France, and in 2001 he lectured on sculpture and participated in the International Studio Program of the National Foundation for Advancement in the Arts in the United States.

A neoeclectic painter, Romero combines his versions of historic paintings by artists, such as Caravaggio, Rembrandt, Goya, and Bosch, with irreverent contemporary images, allowing emotion and reason free range. Armando Romero, also sculptor, has brought to the forefront the Mexican art, the only painter who had a solo exhibition at Zona Maco in Mexico City.

Solo exhibitions 
2013   Inception Gallery, Paris
2011   San Diego Mesa College Art Gallery, San Diego, CA
2011   NM Contemporaneo, Art Gallery, CAD Mexico City, Mexico
2009   NM Contemporaneo, Art Gallery, Museum of Art of Querétaro, QRO, Mexico
2007   Tasende Gallery, West Hollywood and La Jolla, CA
2005   Galerie Morges, Switzerland, (also 2003 & 2001)			
2004   Casa Colon Gallery, Mérida, Yucatán, Mexico (also 2002 & 2000)	
2004   Drexel Gallery, Monterrey, Mexico		
2003   Morelia Cultural Center, Michoacan, Mexico			
2002   Loft 523, New Orleans, Louisiana		
2001   Macay Museum, Mérida, Yucatán, Mexico		
2001   Casa Colon Gallery, Miami, Florida		
2000   Sor Juana University, Mexico City

References

External links
 Works by Armando Romero
Site Officiel de sa galerie
 Works by Armando Romero
 , Artnet
 Armando Romero at NM Contemporaneo, Art Gallery

20th-century Mexican painters
Mexican male painters
21st-century Mexican painters
1964 births
Living people
Artists from Mexico City
Escuela Nacional de Pintura, Escultura y Grabado "La Esmeralda" alumni
20th-century Mexican male artists
21st-century Mexican male artists